Matthew Roy Kenseth (born March 10, 1972) is an American former professional stock car racing driver. He drives the No. 8 car in the Superstar Racing Experience. (SRX)

Kenseth started racing on several short tracks in Wisconsin and won track championships at Madison International Speedway, Slinger Super Speedway and Wisconsin International Raceway. He moved to the ARTGO, American Speed Association, and Hooters Late Model touring series before getting a full-time ride in the NASCAR Busch Series (now Xfinity Series) for his former Wisconsin short track rival Robbie Reiser, finishing second and third in the standings.

Kenseth moved up to the NASCAR Winston Cup Series. He won the series' Rookie of the Year title in 2000 and the final Winston Cup championship in 2003. The International Race of Champions invited Kenseth to race in their 2004 season as the reigning champion and he won the season championship. In 2009, he won a rain-shortened Daytona 500 and won a second Daytona 500 in 2012. As of 2022, he is the last driver to compete in at least one NASCAR Cup Series race in four consecutive decades (1990s, 2000s, 2010s, 2020s). He is the father of Ross Kenseth.

Early life and career

Kenseth was born in Cambridge, Wisconsin. He made an agreement with his father, Roy, that Roy should buy a car and race, and Matt would work on the car until he was old enough to race. Kenseth began stock car racing in 1988 at the age of 16 at Madison International Speedway. "My dad bought a car when I was 13 and raced it at Madison," Kenseth said. "Neither of us knew much and it was a learning experience," He continued to race in 1988 and 1989. "My first car – what might be considered a sportsman – was a 1981 Camaro that Todd Kropf had driven to championships at Madison and Columbus 151 Speedway. On the third night out I won a feature. I ran 15 features in 1983 and won two of them."  "The first night out in the Kropf car Matt won a heat race," said Kenseth's father Roy. "The third night he won the feature by holding off two of the best drivers at the track, Pete Moore and Dave Phillips, for 20 laps. Matt was smooth. I knew then he was going to be a racer." He ran for the points title on Saturday nights at Wisconsin Dells in 1989. He finished second in points and won eight features. On Friday nights, he ran about half of the races at Golden Sands Speedway and half at Columbus 151 Speedway. In 1990, he bought a late model from Rich Bickle. In the season-opening race at Slinger Super Speedway, Kenseth inherited the lead and won his only race of the season when track champion Tony Strupp had a flat tire. He finished sixth in season points and won the track's rookie of the year award. Kenseth entered fifteen ARTGO events that season and raced in 40 features that year. After graduating from Cambridge High School that summer, Kenseth worked for four years selling and shipping parts for Left-hander Chassis, a late model racecar chassis manufacturer just south of the Wisconsin-Illinois border. In 1991 he won the ARTGO race at La Crosse Fairgrounds Speedway to become the youngest winner in the series' history. He passed Joe Shear and Steve Holzhausen, and held off Steve and Tom Carlson for the win. 1992 was a difficult year for Kenseth. He won three races and blew up more engines than he could count. He was ready to quit racing after the season. "I felt we were at a standstill,” he said. "I wasn't gaining. My dad and I had some major discussions at the end of the year. We had to find the dollars for a good program or I told him I would rather not race." Kipley Performance loaned a motor to Kenseth for the season-final race at La Crosse and the team ran better. Kenseth built a new car for 1993 using a Kipley engine. He used the car at Madison to win eight features and finished second in the points. Mike Butz offered Kenseth the chance to race his late model, and it took some time for the combination to stop struggling before they started winning features. At the end of the season, they won the final short track series race at Madison, La Crosse, and I-70 Speedway. He finished third in the points Butz's car at Wisconsin International Raceway.

The 1994 and 1995 seasons established Kenseth as a short track star. Kenseth made a name for himself while driving at several Wisconsin tracks, beating nationally known drivers such as Dick Trickle and Robbie Reiser. He raced 60 times in three different cars in 1994, winning track championships at both Wisconsin International Raceway (WIR) on Thursday nights and Madison on Friday nights. Kenseth competed against Reiser at Madison, and won 12 of 17 features at the track. He won the 1994 Slinger Nationals at Slinger Super Speedway. In 1995, he repeated with back-to-back championships at WIR and Runner-Up at Madison, plus he won the Red, White, and Blue state championship series at WIR on three Saturday nights. Butz's wife Patty Butz said "We knew by 1995 that Matt had too much talent to be with us for very long."

Kenseth decided to move across the country in 1996 to the Southern United States to race for engine builder Carl Wegner in the Hooters Series Late Model championship.  The plan was to run the Hooters Series, five NASCAR Craftsman Truck Series races, and five Busch Series before moving full-time into the Busch Series in 1997. He finished third in the Hooters Series, nearly winning the series championship as a rookie. In 1996, Kenseth made his Busch Series debut at the spring race at Lowe's Motor Speedway for Wegner, finishing 22nd after starting 30th in a car rented from Bobby Dotter. Kenseth was disappointed because they were unable to attract major sponsorship. "It was just like 1992,” Kenseth said. "Plans just didn't work. I thought things would be different. Personally, I had moved and was adjusting to being a thousand miles from home." At the end of the season, the Wegner/Kenseth team closed, and Kenseth found a ride for Gerry Gunderman's American Speed Association team, who was also Alan Kulwicki's last shop in Wisconsin before moving to NASCAR. The team raced together for two races in 1997 before Kenseth received a telephone call from a former competitor.

Busch Series

In 1997, racer Tim Bender was injured, and Bender's crew chief/car owner Robbie Reiser hired his former competitor and rival Kenseth to race for him despite having only one Busch start. Reiser said "Matt and I used to have some fierce races against each other. I needed someone who understood race cars the way I understood them. I knew he could drive and he could talk to me in a manner I could understand." Kenseth qualified third for the new team's first race. He was racing in third place in the final laps when he spun and finished eleventh. Kenseth qualified in 20th place for the next race at Talladega in his second time at a track big enough to have a significant draft. He passed thirteen cars to finish seventh. Kenseth had two Top 5 finishes during the partial season. The following year he raced full-time all season. He won his first Busch Series race on February 22, 1998, when he nudged leader Tony Stewart's car entering the final turn of the final lap, culmulating in a second- and third-place finishes in the Busch points. Kenseth drove the No. 17 Chevy.

Kenseth won the last two races of the Busch season in 2006 driving the No. 17 Ford Fusion, at Phoenix and Homestead.

In 2007, Kenseth planned to run 23 Busch race. Kenseth won the Stater Brothers 300 at California Speedway in February and the O'Reilly 300 at Texas Motor Speedway in April.

Kenseth broke an 18 race winless streak as he won the 2008 Nicorette 300 at the Atlanta Motor Speedway. Kenseth's 23rd career series victory came after the series was renamed the Nationwide Series. On lap 104 at the 2009 Aaron 312 on April 25, Kenseth took a wild ride flipping over 3.5 times, sliding on his roof, then completed a fourth flip. The car burst into flames, and Kenseth walked away.

Kenseth won the Diamond Hill Plywood 200 at Darlington Raceway in 2009. Kenseth led only the last four laps of the race – three of them under caution – after Busch had to pull into the pits due to a flat right-rear tire during the penultimate caution period and just as the race was about to get into a green-white-checkered finish.

On May 28, 2011, Kenseth won the Top Gear 300 at Charlotte. Kenseth, filling in for Trevor Bayne, passed Roush Fenway teammate Carl Edwards with two laps to go to win his only Nationwide Start of the 2011 season.

In 2013, Kenseth returned to the Nationwide Series for 16 races driving Joe Gibbs Racing's No. 18 Toyota. Kenseth finished with 7 top-five and 14 top-ten finishes. He won the summer race in Daytona and the fall race in Kansas.

In 2014, Kenseth drove in 19 races in the No. 20, with 10 top-five and 15 top-ten finishes. He won the last race of the year at Homestead, his 29th and final career victory in the Series.

Cup Series

1998–1999

Kenseth's first Winston Cup series race attempt came at Talladega in May 1998. Jack Roush of Roush Racing was interested in hiring Kenseth and the rest of the Reiser team, so he had Kenseth attempt Talladega in the No. 60 Ford. However this was a sixth entry for Roush in the race, and did not have a powerful enough engine to make the field.

Kenseth's next attempt was at Dover in 1998, when he filled in for Bill Elliott in his No. 94 Ford for Elliott-Marino Racing. Elliott was attending his father's funeral on the day of the race. He finished sixth, the third best debut of any driver. The last driver before Kenseth to debut with a top-ten finish had been Rusty Wallace in 1980 with a second-place finish in Atlanta.

Kenseth and the No. 17 Reiser Racing team were hired for several Cup Series races in 1999 by Roush Racing.

2000–02
In 2000, Roush hired the No. 17 team full-time for Cup Series racing with a sponsorship from DeWalt. Kenseth beat out Dale Earnhardt Jr. to win the Raybestos Rookie of the Year. He won the Coca-Cola 600 at Charlotte, and is the only rookie to win the famed 600 mile event. He went on to finish 14th in points with four Top 5s and 11 Top 10s, and an average finish of 18.9.

In 2001, Kenseth didn't win but improved to 13th in points with four Top 5s and nine Top 10 finishes. Robbie Reiser and Kenseth's pit crew won the Unocal 76 World Pit Crew Competition.

In 2002, Kenseth won the most races—five total—and one pole, but inconsistency caused him to finish eighth in the final points. His wins came at Rockingham, Texas, Michigan, Richmond, and Phoenix. Kenseth's pit crew won a second Unocal 76 World Pit Crew Competition.

2003

In 2003, he dominated in the points standings and leading the last 33 of 36 races and became the 2003 NASCAR Winston Cup champion, the last driver to ever hold that title. Kenseth also had a series best 25 Top 10 finishes in the 2003 season.
2003 began with a 20th-place finish in the Daytona 500, but quickly sped to the front. Fresh off his only win of the season at Las Vegas, Kenseth took the point standings lead after a fourth-place finish at Atlanta in the season's fourth week. He never relinquished the top spot, remaining No. 1 for 33 consecutive weeks, and setting a new modern-era record for most weeks at No. 1. The previous mark was 30 weeks, set by Dale Earnhardt during his first title season of 1980.
With one race remaining, he clinched the 2003 series crown with a fourth-place finish at Rockingham on Nov. 9, in the season's penultimate event. He finished with a 90-point margin over runner-up Jimmie Johnson.
He displayed amazing consistency during his title run, spending 35 of 36 weeks in the NASCAR Top 10. Only week outside that elite group came after a 20th-place finish in the season-opening Daytona 500. He finished with one win, 11 Top 5s, and a series-high 25 Top 10 finishes.
He became the fifth different champion in five years, and the third consecutive former Raybestos Rookie of the Year to win the series title.

At Charlotte, Kenseth won his second pole of the year. He was battling a loose/tight car. On a late caution, Kenseth took a gamble with a few other drivers and stayed out on the track during the last caution of the race. It paid off and he finished in fourth-place.

Championship controversy
After the 2003 season, Kenseth's championship  became a source of controversy and criticism. Critics of the Winston Cup points system, most notably Roger Penske, questioned how a driver could win a season championship despite winning only one race out of 36 during the season. Additionally, the fact that Kenseth led the points standings for 33 weeks despite only having the one victory, as well as already having clinched the Winston Cup title with one week to go in the season (rendering the final race in essence a non-event) led to discussions on how to prevent Kenseth's feat from happening again (by comparison, in 2000, under the same points system, Bobby Labonte had won the Winston Cup championship after leading in points for 31 of the 34 races, but unlike Kenseth, Labonte won four races in his championship year and also clinched the championship one race early). Kenseth finished that year with 11 top-five finishes and 25 top-ten finishes.

As a result, 2004 saw the implementation of a new points and playoffs system titled "The Chase for the Nextel Cup" after Winston was replaced as primary sponsor of NASCAR's top series by Nextel Communications. In essence, the system created a 10 race playoff, with only the top-ten drivers in points after the first 26 races competing for the championship. Moreover, the system placed an emphasis, and a points premium, on wins. As a result, the term "The Matt Kenseth Rule" was coined to describe NASCAR's adoption of the current points system. NASCAR acknowledged that the 2003 championship outcome was not the driving factor in establishment of The Chase, as it had been researching methods to adjust the points system to put more emphasis on winning races since 2000. However, the coincidence of the commencement of the new format in 2004 and Kenseth's 2003 championship linked the issues, and were even referred to by NASCAR officials in the interviews and press releases following the announcement of the new format.

2004–05
In 2004, Kenseth won the International Race of Champions (IROC) championship. He qualified for the inaugural Nextel Cup, finished eighth in the final NASCAR point standings. Kenseth finished with two wins, those coming back-to-back early in the year at Rockingham and Las Vegas. His win in the Subway 400 at Rockingham was a photo finish with eventual Raybestos Rookie of the Year Kasey Kahne. He also won the All-Star Race. Began the 10-race Chase in 5th place and finished eighth, and is of only four drivers to be ranked in the Top 10 all season.

Kenseth started the 2005 season with relatively poor finishes but had a strong mid-season run. He rose from the 24th position in championship points after fourteen races to eighth after 26 races, and he qualified for the Chase for the Cup. He finished seventh in the final points standings with one win coming at Bristol. Kenseth made his 200th career start. His totals after his first 200 starts were: one championship, 10 wins, 40 Top 5s, 85 Top 10s, one pole position, and more than $28.5 million earnings. He also led a career high 1,001 laps.

2006–10

Kenseth began the 2006 season by leading early in the Daytona 500 before spinning his car after contact with Tony Stewart. He fell two laps down to the leaders, but rallied back to a 15th-place finish. He won the following race at California Speedway, and became the points leader after the eighth race at Phoenix. In the Dover spring race, he won his second race of the season after recovering from the sixth position with sixty laps to reclaim the lead from Jamie McMurray on lap 397. With twelve races remaining in the season, Kenseth won the Sharpie 500 at the Bristol Motor Speedway, securing his position in the Chase for the Nextel Cup. He finished the year with winnings of $9,524,966, his take for second place in the Driver's Championship. During the season, he was either first or second in points for 27 of the 36 weeks, and led 1,132 laps, which ranked second among all drivers.

In the second race of the 2007 season, Kenseth won the Auto Club 500 at California Speedway. After Jeff Gordon wrecked out of the Coca-Cola 600, Kenseth was left as the only driver to complete every lap of the season until he was wrecked out of the Citizens Bank 400 at Michigan where Ryan Newman was trying to get one of his three laps back. The wreck also ended Kenseth's streak of 13 consecutive Top 15s that season. At Watkins Glen, Kenseth while running seventh during a red flag period, saw a shirtless fan run up to his car and request an autograph to his white baseball cap. Kenseth politely declined and security escorted the fan out of the track. Kenseth later expressed regret for not signing the cap.

Kenseth won the Ford 400 at Homestead-Miami Speedway on November 18, 2007. The race was the final event under series title sponsor Nextel, and the final race using the templates originally based on the 1964 Holman Moody Ford Fairlane template. Kenseth finished fourth in series points, and as a result, finished in the Top 10 in the standings for six consecutive seasons, tied with Jimmie Johnson for the most. He earned $6,485,630 in winnings. He also won an additional $100,000 dollars from his sponsor, Safeway.

In 2008, Kenseth was winless and fell to 11th in the points standings. His best finish was second at the fall race at Dover. He had five Top 10 finishes during the Chase. This ended his streak of winning at least one race in six consecutive seasons and finishing in the Top 10 in the standings in six consecutive seasons.

Kenseth started toward the back for the Daytona 500 and worked his way to the lead and led two laps, but soon after his own teammate, David Ragan, squeezed him into the wall, knocking both out of contention and resulting in a finish of 36th.

In the Goody's Cool Orange 500, Kenseth started 28th but finished 31st. He was held a lap for pitting outside of his box early, but later was spun out by David Gilliland and was held for two laps for intentionally wrecking him back. Despite that, Gilliland finished 24th.

Kenseth won the rain shortened 2009 Daytona 500, passing Elliott Sadler mere moments before the caution came out on lap 146 as the result of an accident on the backstretch between Aric Almirola and Sam Hornish Jr. The red flag was later waved and subsequent end of the race, 152 laps in, followed, giving Kenseth his first Daytona 500 victory, and the first Daytona 500 victory for his owner Jack Roush after 20 years as a car owner. He led only one green flag lap (of seven laps led), after starting the race at the rear of the field. It was Kenseth's tenth attempt at "The Great American Race".

Kenseth won the second race of the season, the (Auto Club 500), to become the fourth driver in NASCAR history to follow up a win at the Daytona 500 with another win the following race. Kenseth's bids for a third straight victory went south after engine failure at Las Vegas Motor Speedway. He finished 43rd.

Kenseth flipped his car during the April Nationwide Series race at Talladega. Kenseth won in the Nationwide series for his 24th win at Darlington. He also won the pole at Darlington in the Sprint Cup Series, setting a new track record in the process.

After finishing 25th at the Chevy Rock and Roll 400 at Richmond, Kenseth was bumped out of the Chase by Brian Vickers. This left Jimmie Johnson as the only driver to have made the Chase every time since its inception from 2004 up until he failed to make the field in 2019. As a result, Kenseth finished 14th in points.

In 2010, following the Daytona 500, Drew Blickenderfer was released from his duties as crew chief of the No. 17 team. Todd Parrott was announced as his replacement. Later in the year, Parrott was replaced by Jimmy Fennig. Despite not winning a race, Kenseth made the Chase through his consistency and finished fifth in the final standings.

2011

During the third race of the 2011 season, Kenseth captured his fifth pole of his career by setting a new track record at Las Vegas Motor Speedway. A few races later, Kenseth snapped a 76-race winless streak at Texas Motor Speedway by winning the race on April 9, 2011. Kenseth also won the FedEx 400 benefitting Autism Speaks at Dover International Speedway. On a late caution, Kenseth and crew chief Jimmy Fennig called an audible in the pits and decided to go with two tires instead of four. That proved to be all the difference as Kenseth won for the second time in 5 races. Once he made the Chase for the Sprint Cup, he won the Bank of America 500 at Charlotte Motor Speedway for his third win of the season. Kenseth's second championship hopes went south after several altercations with Brian Vickers.

2012: Final Season At Roush

Kenseth's 2012 season started with him winning his second Daytona 500. On June 26, 2012, it was announced that Kenseth would leave Roush Fenway Racing after the 2012 season. Kenseth did not discuss the details of where he would be racing in 2013 and beyond. When he was asked by reporters if he would give them a hint as to what team he would be with after the 2012 season, where he was in contention for his second championship, Kenseth wryly responded, "No."  On August 25, while leading the 2012 Irwin Tools Night Race at Bristol on lap 332, Kenseth collided with Tony Stewart when neither driver would lift in the entrance to Turn 1. Stewart threw his helmet at Kenseth's car as he left pit road. Kenseth and Stewart had overcome being a lap down earlier in the race before the crash took them out of contention for a win at Bristol.

On October 7, 2012, Kenseth won his second race of the year, winning the fall race at Talladega as a crash unfolded behind him. He led the second-most laps of the race with 33.

On October 21, 2012, Kenseth won his third race of the year and second during the 2012 Chase at a freshly paved Kansas Speedway in Kansas City, Kansas. The repaving created a slick track that brought out a record 14 cautions for 66 laps during the Hollywood
Casino 400 Sprint Cup race. This was Kenseth's first win at the Kansas track and the 24th of his career, and his last with Roush Fenway Racing.

2013: First Season At JGR

On September 4, 2012, it was officially announced that Kenseth would be joining Joe Gibbs Racing for the 2013 NASCAR Sprint Cup Series season, driving the No. 20 Toyota, replacing Joey Logano with the team.

In the 2013 Daytona 500, Kenseth had a strong car, leading the most laps at 86. However, on lap 149, his day ended with engine failure. He finished 37th.

At Las Vegas, Kenseth won his first race in the No. 20 and became the third driver after Kyle Busch and Cale Yarborough to win on their birthday after holding off Kasey Kahne.

At Kansas, Kenseth won the pole, led the most laps, and won the race after holding off another furious charge from Kasey Kahne. However, afterwards, he was penalized 50 points after his engine failed post-race inspection. One of the eight connector rods was three grams under the legal limit. His pole award was revoked and his win no longer counted towards the Chase points. Crew chief Jason Ratcliff was penalized $200,000.00 and suspended for one race. Car owner Joe Gibbs would not receive any owner points for 6 races. The engine builder, Toyota, would not receive any manufacturer points for five races. Joe Gibbs appealed the penalties.

Two weeks later, car owner Joe Gibbs met with the appeals board. The appeals board, feeling that the penalties were too harsh because Kenseth won the race, reversed a variety of penalties. Kenseth was awarded 38 Chase points back, leaving his penalty at just 12 points. He moved up seven spots to fourth-place. Kenseth's pole award and win were reinstated, giving him two poles and two official wins. Gibbs' owner points suspension was lowered to one race, but the $200,000.00 fine stood, and crew chief Jason Ratcliff was suspended for one race. The Toyota manufacturer's points suspension was increased to seven races.

At Darlington for the Southern 500, Kenseth passed his teammate Kyle Busch with ten laps remaining to win his third race of the season and his first Sprint Cup Series win at the track.

At Kentucky, Kenseth took the lead after Johnson spun out, and held off Jamie McMurray to take his fourth win of the season.

After struggling a few weeks, Kenseth had better success when the series returned to Bristol. He held off Kasey Kahne for a third time to win his fifth race of the year.

With five wins in the regular season, Kenseth was the top seed in the Chase. He opened by holding off Kyle Busch to win the opening two Chase races at Chicagoland and at Loudon, his first wins on both of those tracks. With the win at Loudon, Kenseth joined Richard Petty as the only two drivers to win in their 500th race start. It also moved him into 22nd-place, passing Rex White, on the all-time wins list.

Going into the last race of the season at Homestead, only three drivers could win the Chase. Kenseth trailed Jimmie Johnson by 28 points and led Kevin Harvick by five points for second. Kenseth won the pole. Harvick started sixth and Johnson started seventh. At the start, Kenseth had the dominant car. He led a race-high 144 laps to get the bonus point. The only trouble that Kenseth had was on the restart after a caution with 74 laps remaining. He was behind Jeff Gordon, who spun his tires causing an accordion effect. Cars scattered everywhere. Kenseth and Johnson bumped each other causing Kenseth to drop to 12th and Johnson down to 26th. Kenseth made his way back up to finish second behind his teammate Denny Hamlin. Johnson finished in ninth-place to win the 2013 championship, beating Kenseth by 19 points. Kenseth finished second in the final points standings also.

With seven wins, Kenseth had given the No. 20 more wins in a single season than the car ever had in an individual season being driven by Tony Stewart or Joey Logano. It was also a career best for Kenseth, outdoing his five race wins in 2002. But had the current format been introduced, Kenseth would've lost his 2003 title to Jimmie Johnson but would end up being 2013 champion beating Johnson.

2014

At Daytona, for the 2014 NASCAR Sprint Cup Series, in the first of two Budweiser Duels, Kenseth held off Kevin Harvick (whose race was later disqualified) and Kasey Kahne for the win in a three-wide finish. With the win, he started third in the Daytona 500. Kenseth did not lead a lap, but finished sixth.

With the new Chase format, Kenseth won no races, but still advances. His best finish was second at Atlanta after Kasey Kahne passed him for the lead with fresh tires on the second Green-White-Checkered attempt. He led all drivers that had no wins in points.

Still with no wins, Kenseth made it past the first two elimination rounds.

During the second round at Charlotte, after a caution with 70 laps remaining, Brad Keselowski restarted second and Kenseth did so fourth. Kenseth forced a three-wide situation, trying to pass Keselowski on the outside. Keselowski moved up to cause Kenseth to tap Keselowski's right-rear bumper which caused Kenseth to hit the wall. Kenseth fell back to 18th and went a lap down due to the damage he received. He made the lap back with being the lucky dog after another caution. While under caution, Kenseth slammed into Keselowski's right-front and damaged Keselowski's car due to being upset over their previous contact. On a restart with two laps remaining, Keselowski gave Kenseth's teammate, Denny Hamlin a push to get him going. Kenseth finished 19th and Keselowski did 16th. After the race, Hamlin brake-checked Keselowski, causing contact. Keselowski drove around Hamlin and went after Kenseth while he was entering pit road. Kenseth turned a little causing Keselowski to miss doing major damage to Kenseth's car. Keselowski hit Kenseth's door slightly trying to get  retaliation for their earlier incident. After making contact with Kenseth, Keselowski's car unintentional bumped Tony Stewart. Stewart then put his car in reverse and rammed Keselowski's car hard. After getting out of the cars, Hamlin tried to go after Keselowski, but was held back. Keselowski then walked away between two haulers when Kenseth charged between the haulers and physically attacked Keselowski. Keselowski's crew chief Paul Wolfe grabbed Kenseth to restrain him. When Kenseth's crew came over they pulled Wolfe off to restrain him and Kenseth. Kenseth's mechanic, Jesse Sanders, and crew chief, Jason Ratcliff, were called to the NASCAR hauler. Kenseth and Hamlin both were not penalized for the incident since no punches were thrown. Keselowski and Stewart were penalized by NASCAR because of the contact that they made on pit road. Both were fined and placed on probation for this incident.

The next week at Talladega, Kenseth tied a season's best finish of 2nd and moved on to the eliminator round while his current rival Brad Keselowski won the race.

In the third and last round of elimination, eight drivers remain.

At Martinsville, Kenseth came into a turn going very fast, causing his car to wheel-hop. He hit Kevin Harvick hard, who's still in the Chase, causing Harvick to spin. Harvick hit the wall hard and fell 42 laps back. After hitting Harvick, a sideways Kenseth was bumped by Tony Stewart and straightened Kenseth out of his spin with no more damage. Laps later, after Harvick had returned to the track, he saw Kenseth coming behind him. Harvick, purposely checked-up trying to smash up Kenseth's radiator. Kenseth saw what Harvick was doing and checked-up enough to avoid serious damage. Kenseth still finished sixth and was in 4th-place of the Chase. Harvick finished in 33rd putting Kenseth 28 points down and swore that if this race is the cause of him not making it further into the Chase, that he was going to cause Kenseth not to make it either.

At Texas, Kenseth won his second pole of the year, but finished 25th.

At Phoenix, Kenseth started fifth. He led no laps and finished third and was eliminated from the Chase, trailing fourth-place by three points.

At Homestead, the last race of the season, Kenseth still led no laps and finished sixth. He finished seventh in the standings. However, the same weekend, Kenseth was able to salvage his year by winning the 2014 Ford EcoBoost 300 for his final Xfinity Series win of his career.

2015

Kenseth started the 2015 NASCAR Sprint Cup Series season by winning the Sprint Unlimited for the first time in his career, the first win by the newly redesigned 2015 Camry. He started the race in 16th, led 21 laps and held off Martin Truex Jr. for the victory. During the Daytona 500 he started and finished thirty-fifth after being involved in an accident on lap 41. Over the next few weeks, he had his ups and downs. Kenseth won the pole position and returned to victory lane at Bristol to end a 51-race winless streak. Several races later, Kenseth won his second pole of the year in the Coca-Cola 600. On a late caution, Kenseth refused to pit during the final caution of the race, which helped him record a fourth-place finish. In the Toyota/Save Mart 350, Kenseth qualified third, his best starting position on a road course.

At Pocono Raceway, Kenseth qualified seventh and took the lead on the final lap after several drivers ran out of fuel to win his first race at the track and his second win of the season. He qualified twenty-sixth and finished in fourth at Watkins Glen International, his first top-five finish at the track. In the Pure Michigan 400, Kenseth won his third pole and third race of the year. The win moved him to 20th on the all-time wins list, passing Dale Jarrett, Fireball Roberts, and Kyle Busch with 34 career wins. During the final race of the regular season, Kenseth started second and led 352 of 400 laps to win his fourth race of the season. The win tied Kenseth with Kyle Busch and Jimmie Johnson for the most wins entering the Chase for the Sprint Cup.

In the first race of the Chase at Chicago, Kenseth started 12th. He led one lap to receive a bonus point with a fifth-place finish. During the second race of the Chase at New Hampshire, race leader Kevin Harvick ran out of fuel with three laps to go which allowed Kenseth to take the lead. He would go on to win his fifth race of the year and advances to the second round of the Chase. In the next race at Dover, because of rain, Kenseth was given the pole position for being the points leader. Kenseth led 25 laps and finished seventh to retain the points lead. During the Hollywood Casino 400, he led the most laps, but with five laps to go he was unable to keep Joey Logano behind him. Logano purposely made contact with Kenseth, causing him to spin out, knocking him out of a position in the Eliminator Round, that Logano was already qualified for. At Talladega Superspeedway, Kenseth started in the second row of the grid. However, on the final green-white-checkered finish Kenseth crashed and finished 26th, prompting his elimination in the Contender Round.

Feud with Joey Logano
At Martinsville, Kenseth was suspended for two races after a controversial wreck during the race.

Kenseth, who spent most of the race in the Top 10, was involved in a crash, where Brad Keselowski hit him after breaking a tie rod midway through the race. Kenseth lost nine laps for repairs. When he came back on to the track, he intentionally wrecked race leader Logano in retaliation for Logano spinning him out of the lead two weeks earlier at Kansas. The fans went wild with applause and cheers in reaction. Kenseth was immediately disqualified for his actions. After the race, he was summoned to the NASCAR hauler. He was later suspended for two races with probation for six months. Car owner Joe Gibbs appealed, citing an unprecedented and unfair penalty. On appeal, the probation period was reduced from six months to December 31, but the two race suspension was upheld by both the appeals panel and the Final Appeals officer Bryan Moss.

After the suspension was over, NASCAR president Brian France summoned Kenseth and Logano for a meeting to resolve any further issues. Kenseth's original explanation was that a tire went down and caused him to crash into Logano, but he later admitted following his suspension that it was deliberate and had no remorse for his actions. Kenseth's actions had ultimately caused Logano to miss the final round of the Chase, due to Logano finishing badly at Texas and not winning the rain-shortened Quicken Loans Race For Heroes 500 at Phoenix.

Return to Homestead

During his suspension, Kenseth was substituted by young hotshot Erik Jones who recorded commendable finishes for a rookie, 12th and 19th. In both races the fans erupted with applause in support for Kenseth when, at Texas, Joey Logano cut a tire and spun out to finish 40th. At Phoenix, he finished third knocking himself out of the Chase.

During his return at Homestead-Miami Speedway, Kenseth started nineteenth and finished seventh to record his 20th Top 10 finish of the season. His teammate Kyle Busch went on to win the championship for 2015. Kenseth ended up finishing 15th in the standings.

2016
Kenseth started out his season with a promising race in the Daytona 500. He led 40 laps in the waning stages in the race. He took the white flag to start the final lap, but was passed by teammate Denny Hamlin and Martin Truex Jr. Kenseth's attempt at blocking backfired as he went sideways and lost several positions. Kenseth finished 14th while Hamlin edged Truex to the stripe to win the closest finish in the race's history. One week later in the Atlanta race, he was tagged for "improper fueling" during a green flag pit stop and was forced to serve a pass-through penalty. He was given the black flag with the white cross marks for not pitting within three laps. After serving that penalty, he ended up in 31st two-laps down. After the race, he said "I got black-flagged for some type of pit road penalty and I didn’t know it and pitted the lap they told me to do a pass through – I'm assuming they were black flagging us before that and they pulled our card. I never heard anything about it or at least saw the flag or anything, so I came when they told me to come and I guess they must have penalized us a couple laps or something. I don’t really know. I haven’t really seen it.” However, Kenseth did go on to finish 19th. He finished 37th at Las Vegas after being involved in a multi-car wreck with Chase Elliott, Kurt Busch, and Carl Edwards late in the race.

At Talladega, Kenseth started 4th and led 39 of the first 71 laps and got caught up in a late-race wreck with Joey Logano and Danica Patrick causing Kenseth to barrel-roll onto his roof. Kenseth exchanged words with Logano after the race, accusing Logano of shoving him off the track just before the wreck happened. In a post-race interview, Kenseth warned Logano that "You're going to race me right before I'm finished racing." However, a week later, both sides would settle their disputes with a phone call.

At the restart of a caution at Dover, Kenseth started on the inside front row next to Jimmie Johnson. Johnson looked to have gotten a great start but couldn't shift into 4th gear, causing an 18-car wreck. Kenseth made it through, then the red flag came out.  With 10 laps remaining, Kenseth was having a hard time holding off Kyle Larson. But when 3rd position driver Chase Elliott challenged Larson, Kenseth then had no trouble winning the race to end a 17-race winless streak.

At the first New Hampshire race of the season, Kenseth held off Tony Stewart for his second win of the season, and his 38th career win. This win also makes it 2 wins in a row at New Hampshire. The win moves Kenseth into 19th place on the all-times wins list passing Bobby Isaac and teammate Kyle Busch.

After the race, Joe Gibbs Racing was docked 15 owner and driver points Wednesday for failing postrace inspection at New Hampshire Motor Speedway. His car failed the Laser Inspection Station (LIS). NASCAR assessed a P3 penalty that included the loss of 15 points, which drops Kenseth from eighth to ninth in the point standings. Crew chief Jason Ratcliff was also fined $25,000.

In the Chase race at Phoenix, Kenseth was leading late in the race, but on a late-race restart, Kenseth wrecked with Alex Bowman, ending his championship hopes. Kenseth would go on to finish 5th in points.

2017: Final Season At JGR

Kenseth lost sponsor Dollar General prior to the season, leading Dewalt to up their number of races to a 15-race primary sponsor. Tide also came on board for 3 races starting at the spring Phoenix race, though they sponsored an extra race at Martinsville in the spring because the team had no other sponsor for the race. Peak and BlueDef joined the team for Las Vegas and Auto Club. Circle K joined the team mid season to sponsor 6 races during the season starting at the spring Richmond race, where Kenseth was able to get his first pole and first stage win of the season, though Circle K ended up sponsoring an extra race due to the team having no other sponsor. Despite these deals, the 20 team still had to use Toyotacare as a fill-in sponsor at the spring Texas race and the spring Dover race. After a slow start to the season, Kenseth picked up his performance and came back to contend with Clint Bowyer and Joey Logano for a spot in the playoffs starting with a second-place finish at Watkins Glen, the highest finish of his career on a road course. He won the pole for the regular-season finale at the 2017 Federated Auto Parts 400 and made his 13th Career appearance in the Playoffs despite finishing 38th. Kenseth led most of stage 1 until he locked up the brakes and brought out a caution. During the final stage, Danica Patrick spun after contact with Austin Dillon. While under caution, Kenseth got into Clint Bowyer as the field stacked up due an ambulance at the entry of pit road. Still, he managed to beat out Bowyer, Erik Jones, and Joey Logano for the last Playoff spot. Had Logano (who finished 2nd) beaten Kyle Larson (who won) on the final restart, Kenseth would've missed the Playoffs for the first time since 2009.

On July 11, 2017, JGR announced that Kenseth would be replaced in the No. 20 by Erik Jones in 2018, leaving Kenseth with no 2018 ride. As a result, Kenseth eventually announced plans "to take some time off" from the sport on November 4, 2017.

With two races remaining for 2017 season, Kenseth had yet to win a race. He was knocked out of the playoffs when an 8th pitcrew member came over the wall to help fix his car that was involved in a wreck. He was disqualified from the race and knocked out of the playoffs. He was still without a ride for the 2018 season. Offers did come to him, but from lower unknown owners to drive for them. He turned them down.

At Phoenix, Kenseth passed Chase Elliott with 9 laps remaining to win his first race of the year, also ending his 51 race winless streak. “Yeah, it’s really not describable,” Kenseth said. “With only two (races) left, I didn’t think we probably had a good chance of getting back to Victory Lane. It’s been, I don’t know how many races – somebody’s probably going to tell me tonight – but it”s been at least 50 or 60, so it’s been a long time. We’ve had a lot of close ones. Just felt like it was never meant to be, and today it was meant to be…. I’ve got to be honest with you, I never dreamed I’d win one of these races, so obviously I’ve been so incredibly blessed throughout my whole career.”  This marked his 39th victory tying him with Tim Flock for 19th place on the all-times wins list.

DeWalt sponsored Kenseth at Homestead for his final race with Joe Gibbs Racing, with his car resembling his rookie paint scheme from 2000. Kenseth finished in 8th place in the race and ultimately ended up in 7th place in the official points standings.

2018

In April 2018, Roush Fenway Racing announced Kenseth would be returning to the team to drive the No. 6 car on a part-time basis, splitting the car with then-full-time driver Trevor Bayne. Kenseth received sponsorship from Wyndham Rewards for a seven-race schedule beginning with the KC Masterpiece 400 at Kansas.

For the Kansas race, his first since November 2017, Kenseth started at the rear as he was unable to set a qualifying time after not getting through inspection. He finished 36th after being collected in a crash on lap 254.

Due to his 2003 Championship (in addition to winning the 2004 event and the fall race at Phoenix in 2017), Kenseth was eligible to participate in the Monster Energy All Star Race which was held on May 19, 2018. Kenseth started from the pole and finished 14th. After a string of mediocre results, Kenseth hit his stride near the end of summer, winning the second stage of the 2018 Brickyard 400 and finishing 12th. Kenseth scored his first top-10 of the season at the fall Phoenix race with a seventh-place finish. In his final race for RFR at Homestead, Kenseth finished 6th.

2019

Kenseth made his first start since Homestead in a Super Late Model at the Slinger Nationals in July 2019. He extended his race-record victories to eight by passing former Roush teammate Ty Majeski on the final lap.

Kenseth served as the grand marshal of the 2019 CTECH Manufacturing 180 at Road America. He also appeared in a coffee-table interview with Kyle Petty on NBC Sports, in Petty's series, Coffee with Kyle.

2020
On April 27, 2020, Kenseth was announced as the replacement for Kyle Larson in the No. 42 Chevrolet for Chip Ganassi Racing for the remainder of the season after Larson was released for using a racial slur at an iRacing event two weeks prior. In addition, NASCAR granted Kenseth a waiver for eligibility in the 2020 playoffs. Kenseth finished 10th on May 17 at Darlington in his return, his 330th career top-ten. He scored a second-place finish on July 5 at Indianapolis Motor Speedway. However, it turned out to be his only top-five and final top-ten finish of the season. On September 21, Chip Ganassi Racing announced that Ross Chastain would replace Kenseth in 2021. Kenseth finished 25th at the season finale at Phoenix (the site of his final victory) and 28th in the final standings.

During a November 18 interview with the Wisconsin State Journal, Kenseth revealed "with almost 100 percent certainty" that he had no intention of continuing full-time NASCAR racing, instead focusing on late models and sports cars.

2023 Hall Of Fame
On May 4, 2022, it was announced that Matt Kenseth, along with Hershel McGriff and Kirk Shelmerdine, would be part of the NASCAR Hall Of Fame Class Of 2023

Personal life

Kenseth is the son of Roy and Nicola Sue Kenseth. The name Kenseth goes back to the 1850s when his ancestors came to Wisconsin. Tosten Eriksen Kjenset-Ødegard came over from County Oppland in Norway and settled in Deerfield, Wisconsin.

In 2000, Kenseth married Katie Martin, also from Cambridge. Kenseth has a son, Ross Kenseth, from a previous relationship. Matt and Katie have four daughters: Kaylin Nicola, born on July 6, 2009, two days after Kenseth finished eighth in the Coke Zero 400 at Daytona; Grace Katherine, born on February 22, 2011, two days after the Daytona 500; Clara Mae, born on March 25, 2014, two days after the Auto Club 400; and Mallory Karen, born on December 20, 2017. Like his father, Ross also raced, driving in legends cars and late models in Wisconsin. Ross would later compete in ARCA and NASCAR. On July 15, 2018, Kenseth became a grandfather when Ross' wife Amber gave birth to a girl, Lexi. On April 8, 2021, Kenseth's grandson, Colt Matthew was born.

Kenseth ran the 2022 Boston Marathon and finished 3,576th overall and 141st in the Men's 50-54 division, with a time of 3:01:40.

Kenseth is a fan of the metal band Metallica, and named his cat after drummer Lars Ulrich. He is also a fan of the Green Bay Packers.

Motorsports career results

NASCAR
(key) (Bold – Pole position awarded by qualifying time. Italics – Pole position earned by points standings or practice time. * – Most laps led.)

Cup Series

Daytona 500

Xfinity Series

 Season still in progress.
 Ineligible for series championship points.

24 Hours of Daytona 
(key)

International Race of Champions
(key) (Bold – Pole position. * – Most laps led.)

Superstar Racing Experience
(key) * – Most laps led. 1 – Heat 1 winner. 2 – Heat 2 winner.

See also
List of all-time NASCAR Cup Series winners
List of Daytona 500 winners
List of NASCAR Sprint All-Star Race drivers
List of NASCAR Sprint Cup Series champions
List of people from Wisconsin

References

External links

 
 

Living people
American people of Norwegian descent
1972 births
Racing drivers from Wisconsin
24 Hours of Daytona drivers
NASCAR drivers
American Speed Association drivers
ARCA Midwest Tour drivers
International Race of Champions drivers
NASCAR Cup Series champions
The Home Depot people
RFK Racing drivers
Joe Gibbs Racing drivers
Chip Ganassi Racing drivers
NASCAR Hall of Fame inductees
Multimatic Motorsports drivers